In physics and engineering, torque is the tendency of a force to rotate an object.

Torque can also refer to:

Places
Torque, a townland in the civil parish of Newtown, barony of Moycashel, County Westmeath, Ireland

Arts, entertainment, and media

Fictional characters
Torque (DC comics), a supervillain
Torque (Marvel Comics), an X-People superhero
Torque, in the television series A Man Called Sloane
Torque, in Freedom Planet
Torque, the protagonist of The Suffering video game series
Kamen Rider Torque, a Kamen Rider Dragon Knight character

Other uses in arts, entertainment, and media
Torque (band), an American thrash metal band formed in San Francisco in 1994
Torque (film), a 2004 action movie
Torque (magazine), a monthly motorsport periodical
Torque, a 1970s and 1980s Australian television series about cars, hosted by Peter Wherrett

Technology
Torque (game engine), a game engine
Kyocera Torque, a ruggedized Android smartphone
Torque, an Android Wear application designed by Microsoft
TORQUE Resource Manager, a distributed resource manager

Other uses
Club Atlético Torque, a Uruguayan football club
Torc, or torque, a type of ancient jewelry

See also
 Toque, a type of hat
 Torc (disambiguation)
 Tork (disambiguation)